FIBA Asia Under-18 Championship for Women 2007 is 18th edition of FIBA Asia's basketball championship for females under 18 years old. The games were held at Bangkok, Thailand.

The championship is divided into two levels: Level I and Level II. The two lowest finishers of Level I meets the top two finishers to determine which teams qualify for Level for 2008's championship. The losers are relegated to Level II.

Participating teams

Preliminary round

Level I

Level II

Qualifying round
Winners are promoted to Level I for the 2008 championships.

Final round

Semifinals

3rd place

Final

Final standing

Awards

External links
FIBA Asia
www.jabba-net.com

2008
2007 in women's basketball
2006–07 in Asian basketball
2006–07 in Thai basketball
International women's basketball competitions hosted by Thailand
2007 in youth sport